Reel Life is an album by jazz saxophonist Sonny Rollins, released on the Milestone label in 1982, featuring performances by Rollins with Bobby Broom, Yoshiaki Masuo, Bob Cranshaw and Jack DeJohnette.

Reception

The Allmusic review by Michael G. Nastos states: "As the career of Rollins moved into fourth gear, his love for hard bop, Caribbean music, and funkier styles continued to appeal to die-hard fans and the urban crowd. A matchless melodic tenor saxophone, Rollins just kept rolling along."

Track listing
All compositions by Sonny Rollins except as indicated
 "Reel Life" - 6:14  
 "McGhee" (Howard McGhee, Sonny Rollins) - 4:20  
 "Rosita's Best Friend" - 6:22  
 "Sonny Side Up" (Yoshiaki Masuo) - 6:47  
 "My Little Brown Book" (Billy Strayhorn) - 3:55  
 "Best Wishes"  - 5:43  
 "Solo Reprise (Sonny)" - 2:12  
Recorded at Fantasy Studios, Berkeley, CA, on August 17–22, 1982

Personnel
Sonny Rollins - tenor saxophone
Bobby Broom - guitar
Yoshiaki Masuo - guitar, electric guitar, claves
Bob Cranshaw - electric bass, cabasa
Jack DeJohnette - drums, congas, maracas

References

1984 albums
Milestone Records albums
Sonny Rollins albums